The 10,000 metres speed skating event was part of the speed skating at the 1960 Winter Olympics programme. It was the last speed skating contest at this Games. The competition was held on the Squaw Valley Olympic Skating Rink and for the first time at the Olympics on artificially frozen ice. It was held on Saturday, February 27, 1960. Thirty speed skaters from 15 nations competed.

Medalists

Records
These were the standing world and Olympic records (in minutes) prior to the 1960 Winter Olympics.

(*) The record was set on naturally frozen ice.

(**) The record was set in a high altitude venue (more than 1000 metres above sea level) and on naturally frozen ice.

At first Kjell Bäckman bettered the world record with 16:14.2 minutes. Then Knut Johannesen set a new world record with 15:46.6 minutes and bettered the old record by more than 45 seconds.

Results

Nikolajs Štelbaums was disqualified.

References

External links
Official Olympic Report
 

Men's speed skating at the 1960 Winter Olympics